WordPress.com is a platform for self-publishing that is popular for blogging and other works. It is owned and operated by Automattic, Inc. It is run on a modified version of WordPress software. This website provides free blog hosting for registered users and is financially supported via paid upgrades, "VIP" services and advertising.

While Automattic is among the many companies contributing to the WordPress project, neither it nor WordPress.com are affiliated with the WordPress software/project or the WordPress Foundation.

History 
The website opened to beta testers on August 8, 2005 and opened to the public on November 21, 2005. It was initially launched as an invitation-only service, although at one stage, accounts were also available to users of the Flock web browser. As of February 2017, over 77 million new posts and 42.7 million new comments are published monthly on the service.

Registration is not required to read or comment on blogs hosted on the site, except if chosen by the blog owner. Registration is required to own or post in a weblog. All the basic and original features of the site are free-to-use. However, some features are not available in the free plan: install PHP plugins, customize theme CSS, write JavaScript, domain mapping, domain registration, removal of ads, website redirection, video upload, storage upgrades...

In September 2010, it was announced that Windows Live Spaces, Microsoft's blogging service, would be closing and that Microsoft would partner with WordPress.com for blogging services.

In December 2019, WordPress.com gave SFTP and PHPMyAdmin access to Business and eCommerce plans.

As of 2021, 41% of websites are built on WordPress.

Advertising 
If the free plan is in use, readers see ads on WordPress.com pages, though WordPress.com claims that it is rare. On its support pages, WordPress.com says it "sometimes display[s] advertisements on your blog to help pay the bills". In order to remove the ads, users need to purchase a Plan that starts at $4 a month (if billed annually).

Censorship 
In August 2007, Adnan Oktar, a Turkish creationist, was able to get a Turkish court to block Internet access to WordPress.com for all of Turkey. His lawyers argued that blogs on WordPress.com contained libellous material on Oktar and his colleagues which WordPress.com staff was unwilling to remove.

Matt Mullenweg commented: "WordPress.com supports free speech and doesn't shut people down for 'uncomfortable thoughts and ideas, in fact, we're blocked in several countries because of that."

In August 2018, WordPress.com began removing several pages that suggested the Sandy Hook Elementary School shooting was a hoax.

Politics 
In advance of the Australian Marriage Law Postal Survey of 2017, a rainbow banner was placed at the top of the WordPress Reader. This was also done in June 2015, in celebration of the US Supreme Court ruling that same-sex marriage is a constitutional right.

See also 

 Automattic
 WooCommerce
 Comparison of free blog hosting services

References

External links 

 
 Usage statistics and market share of WordPress for websites - W3Techs

 
Automattic
Blog hosting services
Internet properties established in 2005
Internet services supporting OpenID
Online mass media companies of the United States
Open-source cloud applications